The National Taitung Living Art Center is an art center in Taitung City, Taitung County, Taiwan.

Activities
The center regularly holds various live music performances.

See also
 List of tourist attractions in Taiwan

References

External links
  

Art centers in Taitung County